Ellie Kisyombe is a Malawian activist and former asylum seeker living in Ireland. She is the co-founder of Our Table.

Career

Activism
Kisyombe began her activism by volunteering with the Irish Refugee Council where she met café owner and Irish Examiner food columnist Michelle Darmody with whom she founded Our Table, initially catering events at venues such as the Irish Museum of Modern Art. They held a pop-up café in the Project Arts Centre in 2016, first as a two-day event which was extended to three-months. The project highlights the lack of facilities for food preparation in Direct Provision centres and advocates for the ending of the Direct Provision system. After this, Kisyombe was invited by Darina Allen to undertake a three-month internship at Ballymaloe Cookery School. She is now the volunteer director of the company. Our Table have supplied a line of hot sauces, sold by The Good Food Store, and Kisyombe runs a food stall in Dublin since January 2018 with hopes of opening a kitchen that would serve as a training space.

Alongside Sinéad Burke, Eileen Flynn, and Mari Kennedy, Kisyombe was on a panel hosted by Miriam O'Callaghan at Electric Picnic in 2017 for The Women's Podcast. She is also active in the Movement of Asylum Seekers in Ireland, and has spoken out about her experiences of racism in Ireland. She appeared in Hozier's Nina Cried Power video with other activists.

Social Democrat candidacy
In 2019, Kisyombe ran as a candidate in the local elections with the Social Democrats in Dublin's North Inner City constituency. She was the first person living in Direct Provision to run in local elections. She came under scrutiny when The Sunday Times wrote about the discrepancies between her version of her asylum applications and the official records. In particular, this centred around how Kisyombe omitted her asylum application in the United Kingdom in 2014 and other discrepancies in the time line of her asylum applications. This led to the resignation of a number of party members. The party conducted an independent review, and she was allowed to continue her election campaign. Kisyombe claimed that the incident had hurt her campaign.

Personal life
Ellie Kisyombe was born in Malawi. Both of her parents were public servants, her mother in the Malawian treasury and her father was the head of Malawi's agricultural development body. Her father was a polygamist. She was involved in anti-corruption campaigns in Malawi, and her family are members of the opposition political party. Kisyombe believes that her father died by poisoning due to his political activities. After a series of crackdowns, she was advised to leave the country. She spent some time in Bristol between 2007 and 2019.

She travelled to Ireland on a student visa in 2010. She then travelled to the United Kingdom to apply for asylum there. After being arrested there, she claimed asylum in Ireland. She was placed in Direct Provision and was housed in the centre in Ballyhaunis, County Mayo. She was later diagnosed with depression. She has twin children, a son and a daughter, who joined her in Ireland. In July 2019, she was granted leave to remain in Ireland and subsequently took a trip back home to Malawi.

Assault charge
On March 23, 2022, Kisyombe was charged with the February 21, 2019 assault of a female worker at a reception centre in north Dublin where she lived for a period while she was an asylum seeker. The case was adjourned until September 7, 2022 for a hearing in Blanchardstown, Dublin.

References 

Date of birth unknown
Living people
Malawian human rights activists
Year of birth missing (living people)
Malawian women